Michael Harold Chapel is a former Gwinnett County Georgia police officer, who was convicted in the 1993 murder of fifty-three-year-old Emogene Thompson outside a muffler shop on Peachtree Industrial Boulevard in Sugar Hill, Georgia.

Murder of Emogene Thompson

Thompson, who lived in a trailer home with her son, reported to the Gwinnett County Police Department that about half of $14,000 in cash that was in her possession had been stolen. Chapel was the first to respond. He stated to her that because only part of the money was missing, he suspected her son. Thompson told several friends that she was planning to meet with Chapel after he told her he wanted to compare serial numbers on the bills. 

On the evening of April 15, 1993, Thompson was shot in the head while she was seated in her parked car.
Her body was discovered inside her car, which was still running, the following morning at Gwinnco Muffler Shop on Peachtree Industrial Blvd., in Buford.

Trial and conviction

The case was presided over by Judge Bishop. Verdicts in the case were returned from a jury on September 8, 1995 and September 10, 1995 of life imprisonment, instead of the death penalty.

Completely independent of both the prosecution and a mandatory Policemen's Benevolent Association (PBA) review of the accusations, Congressman James Traficant launched an investigation of his own into the charges against Chapel.

Chapel is currently held in Long State Prison.

References

American police officers convicted of murder
Living people
Year of birth missing (living people)
Place of birth missing (living people)

People convicted of murder by Georgia (U.S. state)
Prisoners sentenced to life imprisonment by Georgia (U.S. state)